The 1968 United States presidential election in Connecticut took place on November 5, 1968, as part of the 1968 United States presidential election, which was held throughout all 50 states and D.C. Voters chose eight representatives, or electors to the Electoral College, who voted for president and vice president.

Connecticut voted for the Democratic nominee, incumbent Vice President Hubert H. Humphrey of Minnesota, over the Republican nominee, former Vice President Richard Nixon of New York and American Independent candidate, Southern populist Governor George Wallace of Alabama. Humphrey's running mate was Senator Edmund Muskie of Maine, while Nixon ran with Governor Spiro Agnew of Maryland and Wallace's running mate was Curtis LeMay of California.

Humphrey carried Connecticut by a fair margin of 5.16%. This marked the first time since 1888 that Connecticut would back a losing Democrat in a presidential election, and remained the last such occasion until 2000. This was also the last election until 1992 in which Connecticut voted for a Democrat, though it has not voted against the party since that election.

As of 2020, this was the most recent presidential election in which the Democratic nominee carried the towns of Prospect and Watertown.

Results

By county

See also
 United States presidential elections in Connecticut

Notes

References

Connecticut
1968 Connecticut elections
1968